Sawai Madhopur–Mathura Passenger  is a passenger train belonging to North Western Railway zone, which runs between Sawai Madhopur Junction and Mathura Junction. It is currently being operated with 54793/54794 train numbers on a daily basis.

Average speed and frequency 

The 54793/Sawai Madhopur - Mathura Passenger runs with an average speed of 35 km/h and completes 216 km in 6h 10m. The 54794/Mathura - Sawai Madhopur Passenger runs with an average speed of 38 km/h and completes 216 km in 5h 45m.

Route and halts 

The important halts of the train are:

Coach composite 

The train has standard ICF rakes with max speed of 110 kmph. The train consists of 12 coaches:

 10 General Unreserved
 2 Seating cum Luggage Rake

Traction

Both trains are hauled by a Shakur Basti Loco Shed based WDM-2 diesel locomotive from Sawai Madhopur to Mathura and vice versa.

Rake Sharing 

The train shares its rake with 54791/54792 Mathura - Bhiwani Passenger.

See also 

 Sawai Madhopur railway station
 Mathura Junction railway station
 Mathura - Bhiwani Passenger

Notes

References

External links 

 54793/Sawai Madhopur - Mathura Passenger
 54794/Mathura - Sawai Madhopur Passenger

Transport in Mathura
Rail transport in Rajasthan
Rail transport in Uttar Pradesh
Slow and fast passenger trains in India